Aluru Venkata Rao (also sometimes referred as Aluru Venkata Raya) (12 July 1880 – 25 February 1964) was an Indian historian, writer and journalist. He is revered as Karnataka Kulapurohita (High priest of the Kannada family) in the Karnataka region for his contribution towards the cause of a separate Karnataka state. He became famous for undertaking a Karnataka Ekikarana movement in support of the formation of a state for the Kannada-speaking population of Mysore, Bombay Presidency and the Nizam's Hyderabad.

Rao started a newspaper, Jaya Karnataka, and stated that the sole aim of the newspaper was to strive for Karnataka’s statehood.

Early life
Venkata Rao was born on 12 July 1880 to Bhima Rao, a sheristadar in revenue department. They were of orthodox Deshastha Madhva Brahmin family in Bijapur, Karnataka. He studied for a B.A and L.L.B at Fergusson College, where he came in contact with Vinayak Damodar Savarkar, Senapati Bapat and Bal Gangadhar Tilak. Rao was a close friend of Tilak and translated his Gita Rahasya into Kannada.

Works
Rao began by contributing articles to newspapers such as Chandrodhaya, Karnataka Patra, and Rajahamsa, Karnataka Vritta In 1906 he began to work as an editor for a monthly magazine, Vagbhushana. In November 1922, he started Jaya Karnataka, a monthly magazine that published articles on a variety of topics. About 27 books written by Rao have been published, the first of which was Vidyaranya Charitre in 1907. His other works include Karnataka Gatha Vaibhava, Karnataka Veeraratnagalu, Karnatakathva Sutragalu and Karnatakathva Vikasa. In 1907 he organised a conference of Kannada writers and the next year started the Karnataka Grantha Prasarada Mandali. In 1930 he presided over the Kannada Sahitya Sammelana held at Mysore. In accordance with the wishes of Tilak, he translated the former's work Gita Rahasya from Marathi to Kannada. He independently interpreted Bhagavad Gita and authored the books Gita Prakasha, Gita Parimala, Gita Sandesha, Gita Kusuma Manjari in Kannada.

Karnatakada Kulapurohita
Rao was overjoyed when Karnataka was unified on 1 November 1956. He went to Hampi and performed pooja to the goddess Bhuvaneshwari in the Virupaksha temple and gained the name Karnatakada Kulapurohita. He was sad that the name of Karnataka did not find a place in the list of states mentioned in the national anthem and wrote about its inclusion to the Prime Minister and President of India. He was honoured in the capital of Bangalore on the eighth anniversary of the state's formation in 1963.

Rao died on 25 February 1964 at his residence in Dharwad, and was survived by four sons and a daughter.

Bibliography
Rao wrote books many books, including:
 Vidyaranya Charitre (1907)
 Kannadigara Bhramanirasana (1915)
 Karnataka Gatha Vaibhava (1917)
 Karnatakatwada Sutragulu (Aphorisms of Karnatakawada )(1950)
 Karnatakatwada Vikasa (Evolution of Karnatakatwa) (1957)
 Gita Rahasya, a translation of Tilak's Marathi work into Kannada (1918)
 Nanna Jeevana Smritigalu, his autobiography (1941)
 He wrote six books on Madhwa philosophy

Death
Aluru Venkata Rao died on 25 February 1964 at the age of 83 at his residence in Dharwad.

Legacy
 As a tribute to Rao, the Government of Karnataka changed the name of Albert Victor Road to Alur Venkata Rao Road (A V Road) in Bangalore.
 A CD on his life and works, produced in Kannada and English, was released on his 49th death anniversary by Central Institute of Indian Languages.

References

History of Karnataka
Kannada-language writers
1880 births
1964 deaths
People from Bijapur, Karnataka
Madhva Brahmins